Komki-Ipala is a department or commune of Kadiogo Province in central Burkina Faso. Its capital lies at the town of Komki-Ipala.

Towns and villages

References

Departments of Burkina Faso
Kadiogo Province